Hachez is a chocolate manufacturing company based in Bremen in northern Germany. It was founded in 1890 by Joseph Emile Hachez and Gustav Linde.

History
The company was founded by Joseph Emile Hachez and business partner Gustav Linde in 1890. The Westerstrasse headquarters was located in the centre of Bremen. In 1923, Hachez was walking and took notice of the autumn leaves. It inspired him to recreate the chocolate to look similar to the leaves he had seen earlier.

In 2012, Hachez was acquired by Danish company Toms International. As of 2019, the HACHEZ brand will be distributed by Hanseatisches Chocoladen Kontor GmbH & Co. KG, Bremen, as the successor company to Hachez.

Production
The cocoa that is used comes from the world's leading growing regions, but it mainly comes from South America. The flavor is extracted by using the hot-air currents that are in traditional roasting drums. When the cocoa is ground and rolled, it is an average diameter of 0.0010 to 0.0014 mm. The conching of the cocoa then takes place for up to 72 hours. The confectioners then handcraft the various sweets that are produced. Altogether, it takes over 100 hours to produce and complete the finished product.

Distribution
Hachez has distribution partners in the following countries:

India
Austria
China
Czech Republic
Denmark
Estonia
Hong Kong
Japan
Korea
Netherlands
Norway
Poland
Russia
South Africa
Spain
United Kingdom
United States of America

References

External links
  

Companies based in Bremen
German chocolate companies
German brands
Manufacturing companies based in Bremen (state)
Food and drink companies established in 1890
1890 establishments in Germany